Khandewla is a village in Farrukh Nagar Mandal, Gurgaon district, Haryana State, India. A disaster management system for the village is being established in Hali Mandi.

References 

Villages in Gurgaon district